Canada-Lesotho Relations began in 1966. Canada maintains a High Commission in Pretoria, South Africa which represents it in Lesotho. Lesotho maintains a High Commission in Ottawa and an Honorary Consul in Vancouver. Lesotho businesses can apply for support from the Canada Fund for Local Initiatives, which has funded projects focused on gender equality.

Trade
In 2017, Bilateral trade was $10 million, consisting of $9.7 million imports from Lesotho and $302,000 in exports to Lesotho.

Foreign Aid and Development
Canadian NGOs and Foreign Aid provided by the Canadian Government have improved healthcare and education in Lesotho. Several politicians in Lesotho have used Canadian provided scholarships to get a college degree such as Pakalitha Mosisili, the 4th Prime Minister of Lesotho. Canada continues to strengthen ties by increasing foreign aid and university scholarships for high school students in Lesotho.

References

 
Canada
Lesotho
Canada and the Commonwealth of Nations
Lesotho and the Commonwealth of Nations